Nevidni bataljon (The Invisible Battalion) is a 1967 Slovene film directed by Jane Kavčič.

Plot summary
A group of German soldiers begins to feel safe from partisan attacks while staying in a small town, far from the mountains where the fighting is taking place. Local lads, unhappy with their elders' passive stance, organise themselves into a group and take action. They write anti-German slogans all over the town and the Germans become more alert. A prisoner escapes and the boys decide to help him. They succeed despite the dangers.

References

External links

Yugoslav drama films
Slovenian drama films
1967 films
Slovene-language films